Paul Cholakis (June 23, 1928 – May 3, 2020) was a Canadian football player who played for the Winnipeg Blue Bombers. He previously played for at the University of Manitoba.

References

1928 births
2020 deaths
Players of Canadian football from Manitoba
Canadian football people from Winnipeg
Winnipeg Blue Bombers players